The 2016–17 Four Hills Tournament took place at the four traditional venues of Oberstdorf, Garmisch-Partenkirchen, Innsbruck and Bischofshofen, located in Germany and Austria, between 29 December 2016 and 6 January 2017.

Results

Oberstdorf
 HS 137 Schattenbergschanze, Germany
30 December 2016

Garmisch-Partenkirchen
 HS 140 Große Olympiaschanze, Germany
1 January 2017

Innsbruck
 HS 130 Bergiselschanze, Austria
 4 January 2017

Bischofshofen
 HS 140 Paul-Ausserleitner-Schanze, Austria
 6 January 2017

Overall standings
The final standings after all four events:

References

External links 
 

2016-17
2016 in ski jumping
2017 in ski jumping
2016 in German sport
2017 in German sport
2017 in Austrian sport